Follow Me Quietly is a 1949 semidocumentary film noir / police procedural film directed by Richard Fleischer.  The drama features William Lundigan, Dorothy Patrick, Jeff Corey, and others.

Plot
A mysterious killer, known only as "The Judge", kills anyone he considers worthless and immoral. Lieutenant Harry Grant (William Lundigan) is assigned to track him down. With just a handful of clues, Grant constructs a faceless dummy to help his men conduct their investigation. Meanwhile a persistent young female reporter (Dorothy Patrick) for a tabloid magazine is dogging Grant for a story on the killings, much to his annoyance.

Police finally break the case after receiving an important clue, the significance of which they realize only after the reporter explains it to them. Finally, after cornering the killer during a chase on the catwalks of a refinery, the killer is revealed to be a middle-aged man whose cruel disposition and unattractive appearance lead him to become "The Judge".

Cast
 William Lundigan as Police Lt. Harry Grant
 Dorothy Patrick as Ann Gorman
 Jeff Corey as Police Sgt. Art Collins
 Nestor Paiva as Benny
 Charles D. Brown as Police Insp. Mulvaney
 Paul Guilfoyle as Overbeck
 Edwin Max as Charlie Roy aka The Judge
 Frank Ferguson as J.C. McGill
 Marlo Dwyer as Waitress
 Archie Twitchell as Dixon
 Douglas Spencer as Phony Judge

Reception
The New York Times was dismissive of the film and wrote, "There is no intelligent reason why anyone should heed the proposal of Follow Me Quietly...[f]or this utterly senseless little thriller is patently nothing more than a convenient one-hour time-killer between performances of the eight-act vaudeville bill."  Reviewing it on DVD, Gene Triplett of The Oklahoman wrote, "[T]his obscure gem packs a remarkable amount of thrills and dramatic weight into a mere 59 minutes".  Paul Mavis of DVD Talk rated it 4.5/5 stars and called it a "strange, unsettling film noir mystery, with a disturbing subtext".

References

External links
 
 
 
 
 Follow Me Quietly at DVD Beaver (includes images)
 

1949 films
1940s serial killer films
American mystery thriller films
1940s English-language films
American black-and-white films
Film noir
Police procedurals
RKO Pictures films
Films directed by Richard Fleischer
1940s mystery thriller films
American serial killer films
1940s American films